Alfred Gore Miers (26 May 1869 – 23 September 1944) was an Australian rules footballer for the Port Adelaide Football Club.

References

Australian rules footballers from South Australia
Port Adelaide Football Club (SANFL) players
Port Adelaide Football Club players (all competitions)
1869 births

1944 deaths